The 1898 Challenge Cup was the 2nd staging of rugby league's oldest knockout competition, the Challenge Cup.

The final was contested by Batley and Bradford at Headingley Stadium in Leeds.

The final was played on Saturday 23 April 1898, where Batley beat Bradford 7-0 at Headingley in front of a crowd of 27,941.

First round

Second round

Third round

Quarter-finals

Semi-finals

Final

References

External links
The Challenge Cup 
Challenge Cup 1897/98 results at Rugby League Project

Challenge Cup
Challenge Cup